Gloria Flórez Schneider is a Colombian activist on behalf of internally displaced persons. She is the head of MINGA, an "Association for Alternative Social Policy". In 1998, she won the Robert F. Kennedy Human Rights Award, along with Berenice Celeyta, Jaime Prieto, and Mario Calixto.

In 2004, MINGA advocated on behalf of the people of Catatumbo region, 30,000 of which were displaced following heavy fighting. In 2009, Flórez and MINGA lobbied for an investigation into the claims of drug lord Diego Murillo that he had financed the 2002 election campaign of  President Álvaro Uribe.

See also 

 Catatumbo campaign

References 

Living people
Colombian human rights activists
Women human rights activists
Year of birth missing (living people)
Place of birth missing (living people)
Robert F. Kennedy Human Rights Award laureates